Broom Fell is a small hill in the English Lake District. It lies on a ridge connecting Lord's Seat and Graystones, but is rarely climbed. Alfred Wainwright did however accord it the status of a separate fell in his influential guidebook series, the Pictorial Guide to the Lakeland Fells.

Topography
The North Western Fells occupy the area between the rivers Derwent and Cocker, a broadly oval swathe of hilly country, elongated on a north–south axis. Two roads cross from east to west, dividing the fells into three convenient groups. The most northerly sector, rising between Whinlatter Pass and the Vale of Embleton, includes Broom Fell.

Lord's Seat, is the highest of the fells north of Whinlatter and sends out a long ridge westwards. The ridge begins with a marshy depression before rising to the summit of Broom Fell. It then continues west to the more pronounced saddle of Widow Hause, beyond which is Graystones. Widow Hause, is densely forested on the southern side with the conifers of the Darling How Plantation.

To the south of Broom Fell, is the pleasant valley of Aiken Beck, heavily wooded in its lower reaches. This secluded dale lies between the main ridge and Whinlatter Fell, draining to the west and ultimately reaching the Cocker. Hidden within the Darling How Plantation, is the fine waterfall of Spout Force.

On the northern flank of Broom Fell, is Burthwaite Heights (1,043 ft), listed as a separate top in some guidebooks. This is a small hill beside the vast morass of Wythop. Wythop Moss itself lies to the west and drains (slowly) via Tom Rudd Beck. To the east of Burthwaite Heights, runs the valley of Wythop Beck, emptying rather more effectively between the twin hills of Ling Fell and Sale Fell.

Geology
The predominant rock, is the Ordovician Kirk Stile Formation of the Skiddaw Group. This consists of laminated mudstone and siltstone. To the south of the summit are outcrops of greywacke sandstone.

Summit
The top is grassy, and the summit is marked by the end of a wall coming up from Aiken Beck to the south west. Since this wall connects to no others, and simply stops at the highest point, its purpose is unknown. A summit cairn of approximately 2m in height now exists on the summit as does a small wind shelter made from part of the wall.

The view southward, takes in the Whiteside-Grisedale Pike ridge and the Grasmoor fells showing behind.  Westward, across the Vale of Lorton, are the Loweswater Fells, and to the east and north there are sightings of higher fells on either side of Lord's Seat. The coastal plain and Solway Firth are also seen to good effect.

Ascents
From Wythop Mill a crossing of Wythop Moss can be made, using the old path which gives the only remotely dry footing. Once the marsh is passed an ascent up the northern slope of Widow Hause leads to the ridge.

The alternative is to make use of Aiken Beck, a car park being available near Scawgill Bridge on the Whinlatter Pass road. From the valley the southern slopes of Broom Fell can be tackled direct, or a longer route can be taken via the summit of Lord's Seat.

References

Fells of the Lake District